Jennifer Taylor (born  in England) is a popular British writer of 50 medical romance novels published by Mills & Boon since 1988.

Biography
Jennifer Taylor born on 1 January 1949 in England. She is a Chartered Librarian and worked for many years in scientific research. When she discovered medical romance books, she decided to write.

She lives in the northwest of England with her husband and her dog. She loves reading and travel.

Bibliography

Single Novels
 Final Score (1988)
 Unexpected Challenge (1989)
 A Magical Touch (1989)
 Tender Pursuit (1989)
 Lease on Love (1990)
 Lovespell (1990)
 Guilty of Love (1992)
 Love Is a Risk (1992)
 Old Love, New Love (1992)
 Fox Tales (1992)
 Destined to Love (1992)
 Love Is the Answer (1993)
 Promise Me Love (1993)
 Spanish Nights (1994)
 Playing at Love (1994)
 Chase a Dream (1994)
 Lovestorm (1994)
 Jungle Fever (1995)
 Desert Moon (1995)
 Tides of Love (1995)
 The Pleasures of the Table (1996)
 Enticed (1996)
 Rachel's Child (1997)
 Wife for Real (1997)
 Take One Bachelor (1998)
 Marrying Her Partner (1999)
 Our New Mummy (1999)
 Home at Last (1999)
 The Husband She Needs (1999)
 Small Miracles (2000)
 Someone to Trust (2000)
 Greater Than Riches (2000)
 A Real Family Christmas (2000)
 Adam's Daughter (2001)
 An Angel in His Arms (2001)
 The Baby Issue (2001)
 His Brother's Son (2002)
 A Family of Their Own (2002)
 Home by Christmas (2002)
 The Doctor's Christmas Gift (2003)
 A Very Special Marriage (2003)
 Saving Dr. Cooper (2003)
 The Pregnant Surgeon (2003)
 The Midwife's New Year Wish (2004)
 Surgeon in Crisis (2004)
 A Special Kind of Caring (2005)
 The Forever Assignment (2005)
 Nurse in a Million (2005)
 The Consultant's Adopted Son (2006)
 A Baby of His Own (2006)
 A Night to Remember (2006)
 The Woman He's Been Waiting for (2006)
 In His Loving Care (2006)

General Dalverston Hospital
 Tender Loving Care (2000)
 For Ben's Sake (2000)
 A Very Special Child (2001)
 Touched by Angels (2001)
 The Italian Doctor (2001)
 Morgan's Son (2002)

Heartbeat Series Multi-Author
Life Support (2002)

A & E Drama Series Multi-Author
Rapid Response (2004)

The Carlyon Sisters Series
 Dr Constantine's Bride (2007)
 Dr Ferrero's Baby Secret (2007)

Omnibus In Collaboration
 A Child for Christmas (2003) (with Carole Mortimer and Rebecca Winters)
 Small Miracles / Winter Bride (2004) (with Meredith Webber)
 Gift-Wrapped Love (2006) (with Margaret Barker and Meredith Webber)

External links
 Official website
 Jennifer Taylor's webpage in Harlequin Enterprises Ltd's website
 Jennifer Taylor's webpage in Fantastic Fiction's website

1949 births
Living people
English romantic fiction writers
English women novelists
Women romantic fiction writers